Herbert Arthur Roberts (4 December 1890 – 17 September 1974) was a former Australian rules footballer who played with Melbourne in the Victorian Football League (VFL).

Notes

External links 

1890 births
Australian rules footballers from Bendigo
Melbourne Football Club players
1974 deaths